Gung ho is an English-language term taken from Chinese.

Gung Ho may also refer to:

Film and television
 Gung Ho (film), a 1986 American comedy starring Michael Keaton
 Gung Ho (TV series), a 1986–1987 American sitcom based on the 1986 film
 Gung Ho!, a 1943 American war film starring Randolph Scott

Music
 Gung Ho (album), a 2000 album by Patti Smith, or the title song
 "Gung-Ho", a song by Anthrax from the 1985 album Spreading the Disease
 Gung Ho, a 1980s Irish band formed by former members of the Boomtown Rats

Other uses
 Gung-Ho (G.I. Joe), a fictional character in the G.I. Joe universe
 Gung Ho – ICCIC, an organization in China to support the Gung Ho movement
 GungHo Online Entertainment, a Japanese video game corporation